Stempfferia magnifica is a butterfly in the family Lycaenidae. It is found in the Republic of the Congo and the Democratic Republic of the Congo.

References

Butterflies described in 1964
Poritiinae